Afterglow is a 1923 British silent drama film directed by G. B. Samuelson and Walter Summers and starring Lillian Hall-Davis, Fred Hearne and James Lindsay. It was made at Isleworth Studios.

Cast
 Lillian Hall-Davis as Ethel  
 Fred Hearne as Bayard Delavel  
 James Lindsay as Howard Massingham 
 Minna Grey as Grace Andover  
 Annette Benson as Myra Massingham  
 Simeon Stuart as Judge Maitland  
 Walter McEwen as Bob Farley  
 Caleb Porter

References

Bibliography
 Harris, Ed. Britain's Forgotten Film Factory: The Story of Isleworth Studios. Amberley Publishing, 2013.

External links

1923 films
British drama films
British silent feature films
1923 drama films
1920s English-language films
Films directed by Walter Summers
Films directed by G. B. Samuelson
Films shot at Isleworth Studios
British black-and-white films
Silent drama films
1920s British films